Krzysztof Maciej Zwarycz (born 13 December 1990) is a Polish male weightlifter, competing in the 77 kg category and representing Poland at international competitions. He participated at the 2012 Summer Olympics in the 77 kg event. He competed at world championships, most recently at the 2011 World Weightlifting Championships.

Major results

References

External links

Polish male weightlifters
1990 births
Living people
Weightlifters at the 2012 Summer Olympics
Olympic weightlifters of Poland
Sportspeople from Gdynia
World Weightlifting Championships medalists
European Weightlifting Championships medalists
20th-century Polish people
21st-century Polish people